Isabel J. Tibbie "Tibi" Hardie (February 4, 1916 – November 14, 2006) was a Canadian politician and civil servant from Northwest Territories, Canada. She represented the electoral district of Northwest Territories from 1962 to 1963 as a member of the Liberal Party of Canada.

Isabel was the wife of former parliamentarian Merv Hardie, who represented the predecessor district of Mackenzie River. She ran in her husband's place for the Liberal Party of Canada in the 1962 federal election after he died vacating his seat in the House of Commons on October 18, 1961.

In that election she defeated Progressive Conservative challenger Eugène Rhéaume by fewer than 300 votes in a hotly contested election. Isabel served one year in opposition until she was defeated after facing Rhéaume again in the 1963 Canadian federal election.

Electoral history

External links
 
Isabel Hardie obituary, Northern News Service

1916 births
2006 deaths
Women members of the House of Commons of Canada
Liberal Party of Canada MPs
Members of the House of Commons of Canada from the Northwest Territories
Politicians from Toronto
Women in Northwest Territories politics
20th-century Canadian women politicians